Mario Simard  is a Canadian political science lecturer, press secretary and politician. He was elected to the House of Commons of Canada in the 2019 election from Jonquière in Quebec as a member of the Bloc Québécois. He defeated the incumbent NDP MP Karine Trudel.

Electoral record

References

External links

Bloc Québécois MPs
Members of the House of Commons of Canada from Quebec
Living people
21st-century Canadian politicians
Year of birth missing (living people)
Politicians from Saguenay, Quebec